= Arhedi =

- village
- Location within Madhya Pradesh Location within India
- Coordinates: 23.2777052°N 77.486688°E
- Country: India
- State: Madhya Pradesh
- District: Bhopal
- Tehsil: Huzur
- Elevation: 481 m (1,578 ft)

Population (2011)
  - Total: 525
- Time zone: UTC+5:30 (IST)
- ISO 3166 code: MP-IN
- 2011 census code: 482428

Arhedi is a village in the Bhopal district of Madhya Pradesh, India. It is located in the Huzur tehsil and the Phanda block.

== Demographics ==
According to the 2011 census of India, Arhedi has 106 households. The effective literacy rate (i.e. the literacy rate of population excluding children aged 6 and below) is 77.61%.

Demographics (2011 Census)
	Total	Male	Female
Population	525	274	251
Children aged below 6 years	56	31	25
Scheduled caste	187	100	87
Scheduled tribe	0	0	0
Literates	364	188	176
Workers (all)	177	117	60
Main workers (total)	170	115	55
Main workers: Cultivators	48	45	3
Main workers: Agricultural labourers	109	61	48
Main workers: Household industry workers	0	0	0
Main workers: Other	13	9	4
Marginal workers (total)	7	2	5
Marginal workers: Cultivators	0	0	0
Marginal workers: Agricultural labourers	6	1	5
Marginal workers: Household industry workers	0	0	0
Marginal workers: Others	1	1	0
Non-workers	348	157	191
